V.S.O.P. was an American jazz quintet consisting of Herbie Hancock (piano, keyboards, synthesizers, and vocals), Wayne Shorter (tenor saxophone and soprano saxophone), Ron Carter (bass), Tony Williams (drums), and Freddie Hubbard (trumpet and flugelhorn).
Hancock, Shorter, Carter, and Williams had all been members of the Miles Davis Quintet during the 1960s.

V.S.O.P. was essentially a live band: it produced only one studio album (Five Stars in 1979) and four live albums.

The name V.S.O.P. is taken from a grade of Cognac brandy, where it signifies aged (and implicitly high quality) stock.

Discography

Studio albums

Live albums

 *This release was only the second CD coupled with the re-release of Live Under The Sky when it was released in the USA, so it was brought back to Japan.

See also
 VSOP (live album by Herbie Hancock)

References

External links
 V.S.O.P. on AllMusic
 V.S.O.P. discography on discogs.com

Hard bop ensembles
Jazz supergroups